The 2008 Waterford Senior Football Championship is the championship of the Waterford Senior Football Championship, the premier gaelic football competition in County Waterford, having commenced on 11 May 2008.  There were 13 teams in the championship, structured into 2 groups of four teams and 1 group of 5 teams.  From these groups, quarter finals, and semi-finals were played with a county final played in Fraher Field.  Ballinacourty were the defending champions having beaten Ardmore in the 2007 final.

Championship Structure
13 teams are competing in the 2008 championship.  The 13 teams are split into 3 groups, 2 of which contain 4 teams and 1 which contains 5 teams.  The top 2 teams in each of the 3 groups automatically progress into the quarter-finals. The 3rd placed teams in all groups qualify for a Round of 16 game, with two winners gaining entry into the quarter-final.

Teams on equal points in each group are ranked by highest points difference (points scored less points conceded).  However, no team may be eliminated from the championship who finish on equal points.  For this reason, playoffs are needed in both Group A and Group C to decide who finishes 3rd in this group and to decide who moves on in the championship.

Group A

Standings

Matches

3rd/4th Place Playoff

Group B

Standings

Matches

Group C

Standings

Matches

3rd/4th Place Playoff

Relegation playoffs

Matches

Knockout phase
 6 teams, the top two finishers from each of the 3 groups, qualify directly for the quarter-finals.
 The 3 3rd place teams are entered for the Round of 16
 Brickey Rangers faced Gaulter in the first Round of 16 game with Brickey Rangers advancing to the quarter-finals.
 As the losing team from the first Round of 16 game, Gaulter faced Rinn Ó gCuanach in the 2nd Round of 16 game.  Rinn Ó gCuanach won this game so also advanced to the quarter-finals.

Round of 16

Quarter-finals

Semi-finals

Final

References

Waterford Senior Football Championship
Waterford Senior Football Championship